Sandala is an Arab village in the Northern District of Israel. Near Afula, it falls under the jurisdiction of Gilboa Regional Council.

History

The remains of a large building, possibly a church, from the Byzantine era have been excavated, Pottery remains from the Byzantine era have been found  and pottery remains from the 7th and 8th century C.E. have been excavated.

In the nucleus of the ancient village, near the mosque, archaeological excavations have revealed pottery fragments dating to the early Islamic and Mamluk periods.

Ottoman era
According to a local tradition, the present village was established in the 18th century in the late Ottoman era by two brothers from the nearby village Arranah, which is today part of the West Bank.

When Edward Robinson passed by Sandala in 1838, he described it as a "small site of ruined foundations," while Victor Guérin, who passed by in 1870, noted it as "a hamlet, situated on a mound."

In 1882 PEF's  Survey of Western Palestine  described it as a "small village on the edge of the plain, built of stone and mud, supplied by cisterns, and surrounded by plough-land."

British Mandate era
In the 1922 census of Palestine, conducted by the British Mandate authorities, Sandala had a population of 146, all Muslims, increasing in the 1931 census to 189, still all Muslim, in a total of 36 houses.

In the 1945 statistics, Sandala had 270 inhabitants, all Muslims. They owned a total of 3,217 dunams of land, while 32 dunams were public, according to an official land and population survey. Of this, 2 dunams were plantations and irrigable land, 3,109 dunams were used for cereals, while 7 dunams were built-up land.

State of Israel
During the 1948 Arab–Israeli War, in March 1948, Palmach units destroyed "a number of houses" in the village. Sandala was captured by the Israeli Army and retaken by the Iraqi Army. Due to its location inside the Green Line, it became part of the State of Israel.

Andrew Petersen, an archaeologist specializing in Islamic architecture, visited the village in 1994. He described the new mosque in the center of the village, apparently constructed on older foundations. The area around the mosque formed the core of the old village, parts of which had been demolished, while the rest was scheduled for demolition. The remaining structures formed a square, containing various houses and courtyards. According to Petersen, some of the deserted houses appeared to incorporate earlier structures, including transverse arches and cross-vaulted rooms, possibly of a medieval origin.

See also
Arab localities in Israel

References

Bibliography

External links
Welcome To Sandala
Survey of Western Palestine, Map 9: IAA, Wikimedia commons

Arab villages in Israel
Populated places in Northern District (Israel)